Ro67-4853 is a drug used in scientific research, which acts as a selective positive allosteric modulator for the metabotropic glutamate receptor subtype mGluR1. It was derived by modification of the simpler compound Ro01-6128, and has itself subsequently been used as a lead compound to develop a range of potent and selective mGluR1 positive modulators.

See also
C19H19NO4

References

Hoffmann-La Roche brands
Xanthenes
Carbamates
MGlu1 receptor agonists